The Gulf of Roses is the most northeastern bay on the Catalan coast of Spain.

These rivers drain the southern flanks of the eastern end of the Pyrenees and Alberes. The area is often affected by the severe Tramuntana wind.

The bay contains the resorts of Roses, Castelló d'Empúries/Empuriabrava, Sant Pere Pescador, Empúries and L'Escala.

The bay was originally settled by the Greeks, who created a trading post at Empúries which became a Roman town before being abandoned after Viking and Muslim pirate raids along the coast. The area was the domain of the Count of Empúries.

The area was malarial swamp for much of the Middle Ages. Irrigation schemes led to much of the former marshland becoming farmland. Tourism caused further encroachment, in particular the 1960s resort of Empúriabrava, which includes canals and moorings for detached villas. An important wintering spot for traveling birds, the marsh has now been designated the Parc Natural dels Aiguamolls de l'Empordà. To the north overlooking the Bay lies the Parc Natural del Cap de Creus.

The bay was also home to the Catalan restaurant El Bulli.

References

Bays of Catalonia
Gulfs of the Mediterranean